Many notable people and groups formally endorsed or voiced support for President Barack Obama's 2012 presidential re-election campaign during the Democratic Party primaries and the general election.

U.S. presidents and vice presidents

U.S. senators

Current

Former

U.S. representatives

Current

Former

Governors

Current

Former

National political figures and former cabinet officials

Military

Mayors

State, local and territory officials

Native American leaders 
Bill John Baker, Principal Chief of the Cherokee Nation of Oklahoma (D-OK)

International political figures

Publications 
See: Newspaper endorsements in the 2012 United States presidential election

Business people

Chefs

Fashion designers

Labor unions

Social and political activists

Organizations

Entertainment

Actors and actresses

Comedians

Directors

Internet, radio and television personalities

Musicians

Bands

Adult entertainers

Screenwriters and producers

Writers

Athletes

Boxing

Baseball (MLB)

Basketball (NBA)

Football (NFL)

Soccer (association football)
 Wayne Rooney
 Cristiano Ronaldo

Skateboarding 
 Rob Dyrdek

Professional wrestling
 CM Punk

Nobel Prize laureates

Economics

Science

See also 
 List of Mitt Romney presidential campaign endorsements, 2012
 List of Barack Obama presidential campaign endorsements, 2008
 Barack Obama presidential campaign, 2012
 Endorsements for the Republican Party presidential primaries, 2012

References 

Endorsements
Obama, Barack
Obama
Endorsements,2012